Naquetia barclayi, common name : Barclay's murex,  is a species of sea snail, a marine gastropod mollusk in the family Muricidae, the murex snails or rock snails.

Description
The shell size varies between 50 mm and 106 mm

Distribution
This species is distributed in the Red Sea and in the Indian Ocean along the Mascarene Basin and Mauritius; in the Western Pacific Ocean along India, the Philippines and Australia.

References

 Abbott, R.T. & S.P. Dance (1986). Compendium of sea shells. American Malacologists, Inc:Melbourne, Florida
 Vine, P. (1986). Red Sea Invertebrates. Immel Publishing, London. 224 pp.

Further reading

External links
 

Muricidae
Gastropods described in 1858